The non-marine molluscs of Martinique are a part of the molluscan fauna of Martinique (wildlife of Martinique). Martinique is a Caribbean island in the Lesser Antilles. A number of species of non-marine molluscs are found in the wild in Martinique.

There are at least 88 species of gastropods (10 native freshwater gastropods and 7 species of introduced freshwater gastropods, 60 species of land gastropods) and 3 species of freshwater bivalve living in the wild.

Freshwater gastropods 
Neritinidae
 Neritilia succinea (Récluz, 1841)
 Neritina punctulata Lamarck, 1816
 Neritina virginea (Linnaeus 1758)

Ampullariidae
 Marisa cornuarietis (Linnaeus, 1758) - introduced
 Pomacea glauca (Linnaeus, 1758)

Thiaridae
 Melanoides tuberculata (O. F. Müller, 1774) - introduced since 1980's
(Melanoides amabilis is reported as a second invasive Melanoides species, but not mentioned in more recent check lists)
 Tarebia granifera (Lamarck, 1822) - introduced since 1991

Cochliopidae
 Pyrgophorus parvulus (Guilding, 1828)

Lymnaeidae
 Galba cubensis (Pfeiffer, 1839)

Planorbidae
 Amerianna carinata (H. Adams, 1861) - introduced
 Biomphalaria glabrata (Say, 1818) - extinct on Martinique
 Biomphalaria kuhniana (Clessin, 1883) - introduced
 Biomphalaria schrammi (Crosse, 1864) - extinct on Martinique
(Biomphalaria straminea is reported as a second invasive Biomphalaria species, but not mentioned in more recent check lists)
 Drepanotrema cimex (Moricand, 1837)
 Drepanotrema surinamense (Clessin, 1884)
(Drepanotrema aeruginosum (Morelet, 1851) and Drepanotrema depressisimum (Moricand, 1839) were reported in the 1950's, but not found in recent years
 Gundlachia radiata (Guilding, 1828)
 Gyraulus chinensis (Dunker, 1848) - introduced
 Helisoma duryi (Wetherby, 1879) - introduced

Physidae
 Aplexa marmorata (Guilding, 1828)
 Physa acuta Draparnaud, 1805 - introduced

Land gastropods 
Helicinidae
 Helicina antillarum G.B. Sowerby II, 1842
 Helicina fasciata Lamarck, 1822
Helicina fasciata fasciata Lamarck, 1822
Helicina fasciala picturata Mazé, 1874 - endemic to Martinique
 Helicina guadeloupensis G.B. Sowerby 11, 1842
 Helicina platychila (Megerle von Mühlfeld, 1824)
 Helicina pudica Drouël, 1859 - not re-collected since the 19th century
 Helicina sp. 1 - probably endemic to Martinique
 Helicina sp. 2 - probably endemic to Martinique
 Lucidella striatula (Férussac, 1827)

Neocyclotidae
 Amphicyclotulus cinereus (Drouët, 1859) - endemic to Martinique, now globally extinct
 Amphicyclotulus martinicensis (Shuttleworth, 1857) - endemic to Martinique
 Amphicyclotulus rufescens (G. B. Sowerby I, 1843) - endemic to Martinique

Annulariidae
 Diplopoma crenulatum (Potiez & Michaud, 1836)

Veronicellidae
 Diplosolenodes occidentalis (Guilding, 1825) - probably introduced
 Sarasinula plebeia (P. Fischer, 1868) - introduced
 Semperula wallacei (Issel, 1874) - introduced
(Several additional veronicellid species may have introduced to Martinique)

Succineidae
 Omalonyx matheroni (Potiez & Michaud, 1835) - introduced
 Succinea cf. cuvierii Guilding, 1026

Valloniidae
 Pupisoma dioscoricola (C.B. Adams, 1845) - introduced

Gastrocoptidae
 Gastrocopta barbadensis (L. Pfeiffer, 1852)

Amphibulimidae
 Amphibulima rubescens (Deshayes, 1830) - endemic to Martinique

Bulimulidae
 Bulimulus guadalupensis (Bruguière, 1789) - introduced in the 19th century, probably extinct
 Drymaeus multifasciatus (Lamarck, 1822) - endemic to Martinique
 Protoglyptus chrysalis (L. Pfeiffer, 1847)
 Protoglyptus luciae (Pilsbry, 1897)
 Protoglyptus martinicensis (L. Pfeiffer, 1846) - endemic to Martinique
 Protoglyptus mazei (Crosse, 1874) - endemic to Martinique

Urocoptidae
 Brachypodella antiperversa(Férussac,"1832)

Achatinidae
 Allopeas clavulinum (Potiez & Michaud, 1838) - introduced
 Allopeas gracile (Hutton, 1834) - introduced
 Allopeas micrum (d'Orbigny, 1835) - introduced
 Archachatina marginata (Swainson, 1821) - introduced
 Beckianum beckianum (L. Pfeiffer, 1846) - introduced
 Lissachatina fulica (Bowdich, 1822) - introduced
 Leptinaria lamellata (Potiez & Michaud,1835) - introduced
 Limicolaria aurora (Jay, 1839) - introduced
 Opeas hannense (Rang, 1831) - introduced
 Pseudopeas sp. - probably introduced
 Stenogyra sp. - probably introduced
 Subulina octona (Bruguière, 1789) - introduced

Ferussaciidae
 Karolus consobrinus (d'Orbigny, 1841)

Oleacinidae
 Laevaricella semitarum (L. Pfeiffer, 1842) - endemic to Martinique
 Laevaricella sp. - endemic to Martinique

Streptaxidae
 Huttonella bicolor (Hutton, 1834) - introduced
 Streptartemon glaber (L. Pfeiffer, 1849) - introduced
 Streptostele musaecola (Morelet, 1860) - introduced

Scolodontidae
 Tamayoa decolorata (Drouët, 1859) - introduced

Sagdidae
 Lacteoluna selenina (A.A. Gould, 1848) - could be introduced

Agriolimacidae
 Deroceras laeve (O. F. Müller, 1774) - introduced

Philomycidae
 Pallifera sp. - introduced

Pleurodontidae
 Discolepis desidens (Rang, 1834) - endemic to Martinique
 Gonostomopsis auridens (Rang, 1834) - endemic to Martinique
 Pleurodonte dentiens (Férussac, 1822)
 Pleurodonte discolor (Férussac, 1821) - endemic to Martinique
 Pleurodonte guadeloupensis roseolabrum (M. Smith, 1911) - endemic to Martinique
 Pleurodonte hippocastanum (Lamarck, 1792) - endemic to Martinique
 Pleurodonte nucleola (Rang, 1834) - endemic to Martinique
 Pleurodonte obesa (Beck, 1837) - endemic to Martinique
 Pleurodonte orbiculata (Férussac, 1822)
 Pteurodonte paritis (Férussac, 1822) - endemic to Martinique

Polygyridae
 Praticolella griseola (L. Pfeiffer, 1841) - could be introduced

Thysanophoridae
 Thysanophora vortex bracteola (Férussac & Deshayes, 1850)

Freshwater bivalves
Dreissenidae
 Mytilopsis leucophaeata (Conrad, 1831) - introduced

Sphaeriidae
 Eupera viridans (Prime, 18651)
 Pisidium punctiferum (Guppy, 1867)

See also
 List of marine molluscs of Martinique

Lists of molluscs of surrounding countries:
 List of non-marine molluscs of Dominica, Wildlife of Dominica
 List of non-marine molluscs of Saint Lucia, Wildlife of Saint Lucia
 List of non-marine molluscs of Barbados, Wildlife of Barbados

References

Moll
Martinique
Martinique
Martinique